Baenningeria is a genus of beetles in the family Carabidae, containing the following species:

 Baenningeria galapagoensis Linell, 1898
 Baenningeria williamsi Van Dyke, 1953

References

Scaritinae